Foster the People is the debut EP by American indie pop band Foster the People. It was released on January 18, 2011 in the United States. It featured the hit song "Pumped Up Kicks" that hit #3 on the charts worldwide in 2010/2011. All the songs featured on the EP were later featured on the band’s debut album, Torches.

Music
The EP features three songs ("Houdini", "Helena Beat" and "Pumped Up Kicks") that were later included on their debut studio album Torches.

Track listing

Release history

References

External links
 

2011 debut EPs
Foster the People albums
Startime International albums